Motilin receptor is a G protein-coupled receptor (previously GPCR38) that binds motilin.  It was first cloned in 1999 by Merck Laboratories. and scientists have since been searching for compounds to modify its behavior.

The primary structure of the motilin receptor consists of 412 amino acids, while its tertiary structure resembles a golf club. The protein C-terminal protein protects from enzymatic degradation, while the N-terminal is essential for binding.

Function 
The primary function of the motilin receptor is to contract gastric smooth muscle during phase III of the migrating motor complex (MMC). In this final phase of the MMC, N-type motilin receptors in the distal antral pump of the stomach are activated. This causes contraction of the gastric smooth muscle, sieving food into the small intestine, and priming the stomach for the next meal.

Motilin 
Motilin is an intestinal peptide that stimulates the contraction of gastric smooth muscle via the motilin receptor. It is produced by enteroendocrine cells in the proximal small intestine and secreted cyclically. Motilin mimetics could be used to increase gastric motility in patients with gastroparesis e.g., constipation-predominant irritable bowel syndrome. However, none of the candidate drugs that have been tested so far have made it to market.

References

Further reading

External links 
 
 

G protein-coupled receptors
Human proteins